The 1988–89 Los Angeles Lakers season was the 43rd season of the franchise, 41st in the National Basketball Association (NBA) and 29th in Los Angeles. This would also be the final season for All-Star center Kareem Abdul-Jabbar. During the off-season, the Lakers signed free agent Orlando Woolridge. The Lakers entered the season as the two-time defending NBA champions. The team won 15 of their first 18 games, held a 32–15 record at the All-Star break, and finished with a 57–25 record, earning them the top playoff seed in the Western Conference.

Magic Johnson averaged 22.5 points, 7.9 rebounds, 12.8 assists and 1.8 steals per game, won the Most Valuable Player award, and was named to the All-NBA First Team, while James Worthy averaged 20.5 points, 6.0 rebounds and 1.3 steals per game, and Byron Scott provided the team with 19.6 points and 1.5 steals per game. In addition, A.C. Green provided with 13.3 points and 9.0 rebounds per game, while being selected to the NBA All-Defensive Second Team, and Abdul-Jabbar contributed 10.1 points and 4.5 rebounds per game. Off the bench, Woolridge provided with 9.7 points per game, while Mychal Thompson averaged 9.2 points and 5.8 rebounds per game, and defensive guard Michael Cooper contributed 7.3 points and 3.9 assists per game. Johnson, Worthy and Abdul-Jabbar were all selected for the 1989 NBA All-Star Game, while head coach Pat Riley was selected to coach the Western Conference. However, Johnson did not participate due to a hamstring injury.

After going undefeated by sweeping the Portland Trail Blazers, 3–0 in the Western Conference First Round, then sweeping the Seattle SuperSonics, 4–0 in the Western Conference Semi-finals, and sweeping the Phoenix Suns, 4–0 in the Western Conference Finals, the Lakers were seen as the favorites in the 1989 NBA Finals, in a rematch against the Detroit Pistons, who they defeated in last season's NBA Finals in a hard fought seven games. However, after injuries to their starting backcourt of Johnson and Scott, the Lakers were swept by the Pistons in four straight games. After the finals concluded, Abdul-Jabbar announced his retirement after twenty seasons in the NBA. Also following the season, Tony Campbell signed as a free agent with the newly expansion Minnesota Timberwolves.

The 1988–89 season marked an end to a run of eight consecutive Western Conference Finals appearances for the Lakers, the most since the 1968–69 Boston Celtics, as in the following season, the Lakers would lose in the Conference Semifinals to the Phoenix Suns in five games.

Draft picks

Roster

Regular season

Season standings

Record vs. opponents

Game log

Playoffs

|- align="center" bgcolor="#ccffcc"
| 1
| April 27
| Portland
| W 128–108
| Magic Johnson (30)
| Scott, Abdul-Jabbar (8)
| Magic Johnson (16)
| Great Western Forum17,505
| 1–0
|- align="center" bgcolor="#ccffcc"
| 2
| April 30
| Portland
| W 113–105
| Magic Johnson (35)
| A. C. Green (13)
| Magic Johnson (12)
| Great Western Forum17,505
| 2–0
|- align="center" bgcolor="#ccffcc"
| 3
| May 3
| @ Portland
| W 116–108
| Byron Scott (25)
| A. C. Green (13)
| Magic Johnson (7)
| Memorial Coliseum12,880
| 3–0
|-

|- align="center" bgcolor="#ccffcc"
| 1
| May 7
| Seattle
| W 113–102
| James Worthy (28)
| James Worthy (12)
| Magic Johnson (14)
| Great Western Forum17,505
| 1–0
|- align="center" bgcolor="#ccffcc"
| 2
| May 10
| Seattle
| W 130–108
| James Worthy (30)
| A. C. Green (8)
| Magic Johnson (12)
| Great Western Forum17,505
| 2–0
|- align="center" bgcolor="#ccffcc"
| 3
| May 12
| @ Seattle
| W 91–86
| James Worthy (20)
| Magic Johnson (9)
| Magic Johnson (14)
| Kingdome14,541
| 3–0
|- align="center" bgcolor="#ccffcc"
| 4
| May 14
| @ Seattle
| W 97–95
| James Worthy (33)
| A. C. Green (10)
| Magic Johnson (9)
| Kingdome14,006
| 4–0
|-

|- align="center" bgcolor="#ccffcc"
| 1
| May 20
| Phoenix
| W 127–119
| James Worthy (32)
| A. C. Green (10)
| Magic Johnson (12)
| Great Western Forum17,505
| 1–0
|- align="center" bgcolor="#ccffcc"
| 2
| May 23
| Phoenix
| W 101–95
| Byron Scott (30)
| Magic Johnson (9)
| Magic Johnson (14)
| Great Western Forum17,505
| 2–0
|- align="center" bgcolor="#ccffcc"
| 3
| May 26
| @ Phoenix
| W 110–107
| James Worthy (29)
| James Worthy (12)
| Magic Johnson (11)
| Arizona Veterans Memorial Coliseum14,471
| 3–0
|- align="center" bgcolor="#ccffcc"
| 4
| May 28
| @ Phoenix
| W 122–117
| Byron Scott (35)
| A. C. Green (11)
| Magic Johnson (20)
| Arizona Veterans Memorial Coliseum14,471
| 4–0
|-

|- align="center" bgcolor="#ffcccc"
| 1
| June 6
| @ Detroit
| L 97–109
| Johnson, Worthy (17)
| A. C. Green (8)
| Magic Johnson (14)
| The Palace of Auburn Hills21,454
| 0–1
|- align="center" bgcolor="#ffcccc"
| 2
| June 8
| @ Detroit
| L 105–108
| Cooper, Worthy (19)
| A. C. Green (9)
| Magic Johnson (9)
| The Palace of Auburn Hills21,454
| 0–2
|- align="center" bgcolor="#ffcccc"
| 3
| June 11
| Detroit
| L 110–114
| James Worthy (26)
| Kareem Abdul-Jabbar (13)
| Michael Cooper (13)
| Great Western Forum17,505
| 0–3
|- align="center" bgcolor="#ffcccc"
| 4
| June 13
| Detroit
| L 97–105
| James Worthy (40)
| A. C. Green (12)
| Michael Cooper (9)
| Great Western Forum17,505
| 0–4
|-

 On June 28, 1989, after twenty professional seasons, Abdul-Jabbar announced his retirement. On his "retirement tour" he received standing ovations at all the games, home and away.

Awards and honors
 A. C. Green, NBA All-Defensive Second Team
 Magic Johnson, NBA Most Valuable Player
 Magic Johnson, NBA All-First Team

Transactions

References

 Lakers on Database Basketball
 Lakers on Basketball Reference

Los Angeles Lakers seasons
Los
Western Conference (NBA) championship seasons
Los Angle
Los Angle